Anti-Narcotics Police of FARAJA (Pelis-e Mebarzh-e Ba Mivâd-e Mixedâr-e Baja) is a law enforcement agency tasked with combating drug smuggling and Illegal drug trade within Iran. Over 4,000 officers of the agency have been killed fighting against the criminals.

References 

Law enforcement in Iran
Drug control law enforcement agencies
Law Enforcement Command of Islamic Republic of Iran